Emil Axelsson (born 26 August 1983) is a Swedish rally co-driver.

Rally career
Emil Axelsson began his rally career in 2000, when he partnered with Simon Johansson in a Mazda 323.

Axelsson made his WRC at 2005 Rally Sweden, where he was the co-driver of the local star Patrik Sandell. In 2006, the Swedish crew won the J-WRC title in a Renault Clio S1600.

Axelsson firmed a partnership with Pontus Tidemand in 2014, but ended in 2015.

Rally result

WRC results

References

External links

 Emil Axelsson's e-wrc profile

1983 births
Living people
Swedish rally co-drivers
World Rally Championship co-drivers